Barood (Barud) is an Israeli bar-restaurant off Jaffa Road in Jerusalem, serving Sephardic cuisine. It was founded in 1995. The last restaurant in its area open on Shabbat, the restaurant is a frequent scene of demonstrations by Haredi Jews. The restaurant features live music.

Gallery

References

External links
Official website

Israeli restaurants
Bars (establishments)
Restaurants established in 1995
Jaffa Road
Restaurants in Jerusalem
Sephardi Jewish cuisine
Sephardi Jewish culture in Jerusalem